Acquarossa means red water and may refer to:

Acquarossa, Italy, an ancient Etruscan settlement
Acquarossa, Switzerland, the capital of the district of Blenio in the canton of Ticino